Cottage Hill, Texas was a settlement that once existed in eastern Bexar County, Texas.

History

The beginning
In the 1840s the Irvin family settled at the 18 mile marker on the San Antonio to Gonzales road.  Soon after, D. A. Saltmarsh established there a stagecoach stop.  In 1855, two wealthy speculators, Gideon Lee and Joseph Beck, purchased land and laid out a town called Cottage Hill. Henry Bowers opened the 20 mile house just east of town, soon William A. Jackson opened a general store and was the first postmaster.

Post Civil War - incidents of violence
After the end of the Civil War Cottage Hill became known for lawlessness and violence. In 1876 a well known gunfight happened in Cottage Hill, in which Tom Secrest and William Irvin were killed, James Applewhite of La Vernia was brought before a grand jury but was released. A gang of 12 young men who robbed and terrorized the area called themselves the Cottage Hill gang. In 1877 John Humphrey was ambushed bringing mail from San Antonio and died a day later. This incident caused the post office to be transferred to nearby Saint Hedwig. The result was a steady decline of Cottage Hill as businesses moved to Saint Hedwig.

Present Day

As of 2021, only forgotten ruins and gravestones remain where the town of Cottage Hill once stood.

References

Unincorporated communities in Texas
Unincorporated communities in Bexar County, Texas
Greater San Antonio
Populated places established in 1855
1855 establishments in Texas